The Vegetable Orchestra (also known as , The First Vienna Vegetable Orchestra or The Vienna Vegetable Orchestra) is an Austrian musical group who use instruments made entirely from fresh vegetables.

History 
The group, founded in February 1998 in Vienna, consists of ten musicians, one cook, and one sound technician. The members of the ensemble are all active in various artistic areas (for example trained musicians, sound poets, sculptors, media artists, designers, and architects) and have worked together on conceptualizing and carrying out their project.

The interdisciplinary approach is a crucial factor in researching and further developing the vegetable music.  The intention is to create a sonorous experience which can be perceived with all senses.

Musical concepts of the Fluxus movement, for example compositions from John Cage could be considered as a source of inspiration for this unique orchestra. Their distinctive repertoire also seems to be deeply rooted in sound art and experimental and electronic music because they play unheard-of interpretations of Igor Stravinsky, the German electronic band Kraftwerk or the Austrian band Radian as well as their own compositions. All the pieces feature various forms of graphical notation and are exclusively composed for live performance.

Members 
The ensemble consists of Jürgen Berlakovich, Verena Fuchs, Susanna Gartmayer, Barbara Kaiser, Matthias Meinharter, Jörg Piringer, Ingrid Schlögl, Ulrich Troyer, Stefan Voglsinger, Martina Winkler.

Instruments 
The instruments are constructed with carrots, celery, peppers, squash, zucchini and other raw vegetables prior to the performances. Their sound is amplified with the use of special microphones.

Following the performances, the leftover vegetables and off-cuts are cooked into a soup for the audience.

As of March 2019, more than 150 types of instruments had been invented since the band's inception and include carrot xylophones, radish bass flute, pumpkin drums, leek violins, onion maracas, and many others.

Influence 
The group performs and average of 20-30 shows a years and have toured Europe, the United States and Asia, playing gallery openings, exhibitions, community events and headlining their own shows.

They received a Guinness World Record for "Most concerts by a vegetable orchestra", for 77 performances by a group of musicians playing with instruments constructed out of vegetables, having performed in venues worldwide from April 1998 to September 2012.

According to the BBC, they have inspired the formation of similar ensembles like the London Vegetable Orchestra and the Long Island Vegetable Orchestra. Discography 
 Albums 
 Gemise (1999)
 Automate (2003)
 Remixed (2008)
 Onionoise (2010)
 Green Album (2018)Gemise literally stands for Gemüse in Bohemian dialect. In Vienna of the time of the Austria-Hungary monarchy, a cooking homehelp or housekeeper often came from Bohemia and contributed to the Viennese cuisine until today. Automate is certainly a play on words with Tomate (= tomatoe). The core of the portmanteau word of Onionoise, ...ionoi... is a palindrome.

The second piece of Gemise is named Ogludschda, which is Viennese dialect for Abgelutschter, or English sucked off, in the second meaning – in German – for a music piece that has been played too often.

 EPs 
 Remix Trilogy (Volume One) (2004)
 Remix Trilogy (Volume Two) (2005)
 Remix Trilogy (Volume Three) (2005)
 Remix Conclusion'' (2008)

References

External links 

 
 The Vegetable Orchestra Literally Plays with Their Food – YouTube video published by Great Big Story
 Who says you can't play with food? The Vegetable Orchestra at TEDxVienna – YouTube video published by TEDx Talks

Austrian orchestras
Musical groups established in 1998
Musical groups from Vienna